A demand set is a model of the most-preferred bundle of goods an agent can afford.  The set is a function of the preference relation for this agent, the prices of goods, and the agent's endowment.

Assuming the agent cannot have a negative quantity of any good, the demand set can be characterized this way:

Define  as the number of goods the agent might receive an allocation of. An allocation to the agent is an element of the space ; that is, the space of nonnegative real vectors of dimension .

Let  be a vector representing the quantities of the agent's endowment of each possible good, and  be a vector of prices for those goods. Let  denote the demand set. Then: 

.

See also
Demand
Economics

External links
http://economics.about.com/library/glossary/bldef-demand-set.htm?terms=Demand+Set

Demand